The 1950 Wisconsin gubernatorial election was held on November 7, 1950.

Incumbent Republican Governor Oscar Rennebohm did not seek a third term.

Republican nominee Walter J. Kohler Jr. defeated Democratic nominee Carl W. Thompson with 53.21% of the vote.

Primary elections
Primary elections were held on September 19, 1950.

Democratic primary

Candidates
Charles P. Greene, former member of the Wisconsin State Assembly
Carl W. Thompson, Democratic candidate for Governor in 1948

Results

Republican primary

Candidates
Walter J. Kohler Jr., businessman
Leonard Schmitt, lawyer

Results

General election

Candidates
Major party candidates
Carl W. Thompson, Democratic
Walter J. Kohler Jr., Republican

Other candidates
Michael Essin, People's Progressive, candidate for Attorney General in 1948
William O. Hart, Socialist, candidate for Lieutenant Governor in 1948

Results

References

Bibliography
 
 

1950
Wisconsin
Gubernatorial
November 1950 events in the United States